Abdolreza Jokar is a Paralympian athlete from Iran competing mainly in category F53 javelin events.

Abdolreza has competed at five Paralympic Games.  The first in 2000 where he won the F53 discus and the bronze medal in the F53 javelin.  In 2004 he won a bronze medal in the F52/53 javelin before winning a silver in the F53/54 javelin in the 2008 Summer Paralympics. In 2012 he won a silver medal in the F52/53 javelin.

Flag bearer in 2012 Summer Paralympics
He was the flag-bearer for Iran in 2012 Summer Paralympics Parade of Nations.

References

External links
 

Paralympic athletes of Iran
Athletes (track and field) at the 1996 Summer Paralympics
Athletes (track and field) at the 2000 Summer Paralympics
Athletes (track and field) at the 2004 Summer Paralympics
Athletes (track and field) at the 2008 Summer Paralympics
Athletes (track and field) at the 2012 Summer Paralympics
Paralympic gold medalists for Iran
Paralympic silver medalists for Iran
Paralympic bronze medalists for Iran
Living people
World record holders in Paralympic athletics
Medalists at the 1996 Summer Paralympics
Medalists at the 2000 Summer Paralympics
Medalists at the 2004 Summer Paralympics
Medalists at the 2008 Summer Paralympics
Medalists at the 2012 Summer Paralympics
Year of birth missing (living people)
Paralympic medalists in athletics (track and field)
Iranian male discus throwers
Iranian male javelin throwers
Wheelchair discus throwers
Wheelchair javelin throwers
Paralympic discus throwers
Paralympic javelin throwers
21st-century Iranian people